Martha S. Feldman  is an organization theorist best known for her work on organizational routines and, particularly, routine dynamics.  Other areas of research she has contributed to include inclusive management and qualitative research methods.  Feldman is the Johnson Chair for Civic Governance and Public Management in the School of Social Ecology at the University of California, Irvine  She has published four books as well as numerous book chapters and journal articles.

Life
 
Feldman was born in Oak Ridge, Tennessee, in 1953.  She is the third of five children born to Melvin J. Feldman and Nancy Ann McCarty Feldman.  The family moved to Idaho Falls, Idaho in 1957 and Feldman graduated from Idaho Falls High School in 1971.  She married Hobart Taylor, III in 1993.  Their son, Bruce Feldman Taylor was born in 1995.

Education
 
Feldman attended the University of Washington from 1971 to 1976, completed her B.A. in Political Science and with W. Lance Bennett researched and wrote Reconstructing Reality in the Courtroom (published by Rutgers University Press in 1981).  She attended Stanford University from 1976 to 1983, earning her Master’s and PhD in Political Science.  While at Stanford she worked with James G. March.  Feldman and March co-authored "Information in Organizations as Signal and Symbol" (published in the Administrative Science Quarterly in 1981).  Her dissertation was a study of information processing and decision-making based on fieldwork in the U.S. Department of Energy, published as Order Without Design: Information Production and Policy Making (Stanford University Press, 1989).

Employment

From 1983 to 2003 she was a professor at the University of Michigan in the Political Science Department and the Institute of Public Policy Studies, which became the Ford School of Public Policy.  She earned tenure in 1990 and became a full professor in 2001.  She moved to the University of California, Irvine in 2003 to become the Johnson Chair for Civic Governance and Public Management in the School of Social Ecology.  Her full-time appointment is in the Department of Planning, Policy and Design in the School of Social Ecology.  She also has appointments in the Departments of Political Science and Sociology in the School of Social Sciences and in the Paul Merage School of Management. She is the founding director of the Center for Organization Research at UCI and served as director or co-director from 2003 to 2012.

Research Fields

Organizational routines and practices
 
Feldman and co-authors (Brian Pentland of Michigan State University, Anat Rafaeli of Technion University, Claus Rerup of Frankfurt School of Finance & Management, Paula Jarzabkowski of City University London and Jane Le of the University of Sydney) have used practice theory to reveal and explore the internal dynamics of these fundamental organizational processes. Her current research on organizational routines explores the role of performance, agency and time in creating, maintaining and altering these fundamental organizational phenomena.
 
Two highly cited pieces by Feldman provide the foundation for this research: Organizational routines as a source of continuous change, (Organization Science, 2000), and Reconceptualizing organizational routines as a source of flexibility and change, co-authored with Brian T. Pentland (Administrative Science Quarterly, 2003).  These two articles form the basis for a field referred to as Routine Dynamics, in which routines are considered to be generative systems consisting of interacting parts.  These articles identified actions (performative aspects) and patterns of action (ostensive aspects) as the mutually constitutive parts of routines.  These systems of interacting parts produce both stability when people (or machines) that enact routines respond to naturally occurring disruptions by making efforts to replicate previous action patterns; they produce change when participants in the routine retain emergent variations.

Many scholars have now contributed to and drawn on scholarship on routine dynamics. Several articles are available in management and organization theory journals, including the Academy of Management Review, the Academy of Management Journal, Administrative Science Quarterly, the Journal of Management Studies, Organization Science and Organization Studies. Routine dynamics research by numerous scholars has been presented in subthemes at the European Group for Organizational Studies conference in 2005, 2008, 2009, and 2011.  A proposal to convene a standing working group of the European Group for Organizational Studies on routine dynamics has been approved and will commence in 2015.  A special issue of Organization Science on routine dynamics is currently under development.

Inclusive management 
Feldman’s research on inclusive management focuses on strengthening community and democratic participation. She has written about inclusive management with co-authors Anne Khademian (Virginia Tech) and Kathryn Quick (University of Minnesota).  Inclusive Management is a pattern of practices by public managers that facilitate the inclusion of public employees, experts, the public, and politicians in collaboratively addressing public problems or concerns of public interest.
 
Research on inclusive management seeks to understand how public managers can enhance the potential for collaboration across boundaries. Boundaries may be sectoral, jurisdictional and organizational boundaries, as well as boundaries between government and residents, between experts and locals and across issue boundaries or time. While the primary focus of inclusive management is the use of all relevant resources, there is clear significance for marginalized groups and the processes that make it possible for marginalized groups to impact public processes.

Qualitative methods 
Feldman’s contributions to qualitative research stem from her experience doing empirical ethnographic research.  She has developed ways of analyzing data that promote systematic interpretation.  Her book, Strategies for Interpreting Qualitative Data (Sage, 1995) shows how to use theories of ethnomethodology, semiotics, dramaturgy and deconstruction as meta-theories to organize and examine rich ethnographic data. Later she (with co-authors Kaj Sköldberg, Ruth Nicole Brown, Debra Horner) developed a rhetorical approach to narrative analysis (Journal of Public Administration Research and Theory, 2004) and (with co-author Brian Pentland) developed a narrative network approach to analyzing organizational routines (Organization Science, 2007).

Her book Gaining Access (written with co-authors Jeannine Bell and Michele Berger and contributions from numerous scholars) is an inside look at the issues confronting qualitative researchers who try to gain access to research sites. The book takes a dynamic approach to the issues of access and develops the idea that access is not just about getting in the door, but also about developing relationships that enable a researcher to have a deep experience of the context.  The “behind the scenes” access stories show how such relationships develop.

More recently Feldman (with co-authors Karen Locke and Karen Golden-Biddle) has tried to demystify the scholarly process by focusing on the logic of discovery. Locke, Golden-Biddle and Feldman (Organization Science, 2008) suggest that doubt is a generative experience in scholarly work and provide strategies for productively using doubt to discover good research questions.

Editorial service 
Martha Feldman is a Senior Editor for Organization Science and serves on the editorial boards of Academy of Management Development,  Academy of Management Journal,  International Public Management Journal, Journal of Management Studies, Organization Studies, Perspectives on Public Management and Governance, Public Administration Review and Qualitative Research in Organizations and Management.

Honors and awards 
Martha Feldman received Administrative Science Quarterly's 2009 award for Scholarly Contribution and the 2011 Academy of Management Practice Scholarship Award. In 2014, she was awarded an Honorary Doctorate in Economics from the University of St. Gallen School of Management and was named by Thomson Reuters as one of the approximately 3000 Highly Cited Researchers worldwide, a distinction earned by ranking among the top 1% most cited for field and year indexed in the Web of Science during the period 2002-2012.
 
Feldman has been a featured or keynote speaker in numerous conferences, workshops, courses and seminars in the United States, Canada, Europe (France, Italy, Great Britain, Germany, Greece, Norway, Sweden, Switzerland) and Asia (China and Taiwan).

Teaching 
Martha Feldman is currently a professor of Planning, Policy and Design at the University of California, Irvine.

Selected bibliography

Organizational routines as practices
Dynamics of organizational routines: A generative model. 2012. Pentland, Brian, Martha S. Feldman, Markus Becker and Peng Lui. Journal of Management Studies. 49(8):1484-1508
Toward a theory of coordinating: Creating coordinating mechanisms in practice.  2012. Paula A. Jarzabkowski, Jane K. Lê and Martha S. Feldman. Organization Science; 23(4) 907-927. 
Practicing theory and theorizing practice.  2011. Martha S. Feldman and Wanda J. Orlikowski.  Organization Science, 22 (5): 1240-1253.
Routines as a source of change in organizational schemata: The role of trial-and-error learning. 2011. Claus Rerup and Martha S. Feldman.  Academy of Management Journal. Vol. 54, No. 3, 577–610.
Narrative networks: Patterns of technology and organization. 2007. Brian T. Pentland and Martha S. Feldman. Organization Science, 18(5): 781-795.
Resources in emerging structures and processes of change.  2004. Martha S. Feldman.  Organization Science, 15(3): 295-309.
Reconceptualizing organizational routines as a source of flexibility and change. 2003. Martha S. Feldman and Brian T. Pentland.  Administrative Science Quarterly, 48: 94-118.
Organizational routines as a source of continuous change. 2000. Martha S. Feldman. Organization Science, 11(6): 611-629.

Inclusive management
Boundaries as Junctures: Collaborative Boundary Work for Building Efficient Resilience. 2014. Kathryn S. Quick and Martha S. Feldman. Journal of Public Administration Research and Theory 24(3): 651-671. 
Distinguishing participation and inclusion.  2011.  Kathryn S. Quick and Martha S. Feldman. Journal of Planning Education and Research 31(3): 271-290. (Received the ACSP's 2012 Chester Rapkin Best Paper Award.)
Generating resources and energizing frameworks through inclusive public management. 2009.  Martha S. Feldman and Kathryn S. Quick. International Public Management Journal, Vol. 12, No. 9:137-171.
The role of the public manager in inclusion. 2007. Martha S. Feldman and Anne M. Khademian. Governance, 20(2): 305-324.
Ways of knowing and inclusive management practices. 2006. Martha S. Feldman, Anne M. Khademian, Helen Ingram, Anne S. Schneider. Public Administration Review, 66(6) (Special Issue on Collaborative Public Management): 89-99.
To manage is to govern.  2002. Martha S. Feldman and Anne M. Khademian. Public Administration Review, 62(5): 541-555.

Qualitative methods
Analyzing the implicit in stories. 2011. Martha S. Feldman and Julka Almquist. In Varieties of Narrative Analysis. J. Holstein and J. Gubrium (Eds.). Thousand Oaks, CA: SAGE Publishing. 
Making doubt generative: Rethinking the role of doubt in the research process. 2008.  Karen Locke, Karen Golden-Biddle and Martha S.  Feldman.  Organization Science. Vol. 19, No. 6: pp. 907–918
Making sense of stories: A rhetorical approach to narrative analysis. 2004. Martha S. Feldman, Kaj Sköldberg, Ruth Nicole Brown and Debra Horner.  Journal of Public Administration Research and Theory, 14(2): 147-170.
Gaining access: A practical and theoretical guide for qualitative researchers; by Martha S. Feldman, Jeannine Bell and Michele Berger and associates; Walnut Creek, CA: Altamira Press; 2003.
Strategies for interpreting qualitative data; by Martha S. Feldman; Newbury Park, CA; SAGE; 1995.

See also
Pierre Bourdieu
Barbara Czarniawska
Anthony Giddens
Bruno Latour
Wanda Orlikowski
Ethnography
Inclusive Management
Organizational routines
Practice (social theory)

References

External links
UCI faculty page
Google scholar profile

1953 births
Living people
University of Michigan faculty